The April or Spring nor'easter of 2007 was a nor'easter that affected mainly the eastern parts of North America during its four-day course, from April 14 to April 17, 2007. The combined effects of high winds, heavy rainfall, and high tides led to flooding, storm damages, power outages, and evacuations, and disrupted traffic and commerce. In the north, heavy wet snow caused the loss of power for several thousands of homes in Ontario and Quebec. The storm caused at least 18 fatalities.

Meteorological history
The storm that would become the April 2007 nor'easter started out in the Southwestern United States, as an upper-level disturbance in the jet stream, on April 13. It brought high wind and fire danger to California, Nevada, New Mexico and Arizona. The storm then moved out into the southern Plains States, bringing heavy snow to Colorado, Oklahoma, and Texas. Heavy rain and severe thunderstorms, with hail, wind, and tornadoes, affected parts of Texas, Louisiana, Mississippi, Alabama, Georgia, Florida, and the Carolinas. The storm then moved across the Mid-Atlantic States, and into the Atlantic Ocean, following the East Coast. The storm then rapidly intensified into a major nor'easter, with the warm waters of the Gulf Stream. The storm stalled just offshore from New York City and continued to strengthen. The lowest barometric pressure recorded was 968 millibars (28.58 in Hg), equivalent to that of a moderate Category 2 hurricane.

Impact

The National Weather Service reported 7.57 inches (192 mm) of rain in Central Park by midnight of April 15, the second heaviest rainfall in 24 hours on record, and indicated that this storm caused the worst flooding since Hurricane Floyd in 1999.
Major airports in the New York area resumed flights on April 16, after having had to cancel over 500 flights before. Local rail and transit  lines reported delays and cancellations affecting the MTA, NJ Transit, LIRR, and Metro-North Railroad. Power failures affected several thousand people.

On April 16, 2007, the storm caused sustained winds of nearly 100 mph (87 knots) on, and near New Hampshire's Mount Washington, with gusts topping out at 156 mph (136 knots).

While areas closer to the shore received heavy rainfall, higher regions inland  received unseasonal snow. Several towns suffered from flooding including Mamaroneck in New York, and Bound Brook and Manville in New Jersey,  while coastal towns had to deal with damage from high tides.  Most major highways in Westchester County, New York were closed on April 15 and April 16 due to extreme flooding. In Quebec, several regions including the Laurentides and Charlevoix regions received in excess of 6 inches (15 cm) of snow with areas exceeding well above 1 foot (30 cm) of snow. In the city of Ottawa, 17 cm (5 in) of heavy wet snow fell in just a few hours causing power lines and trees to fall down causing scattered blackouts in several parts of the city.  Similar damage was reported in the higher elevations north of Montreal and Ottawa.

In total, more than 175,000 homes in Canada suffered a power outage, including 160,000 Hydro-Québec customers mainly in areas from Gatineau towards Quebec City including Montreal, Lanaudière and the Laurentians with an additional 15,000 Hydro One and Hydro Ottawa customers.  In the US over a quarter million homes lost power with New York and Pennsylvania being the hardest hit states due to the strong winds.

Governor Eliot Spitzer of New York activated 3,200 members of the National Guard on alert. Richard Codey, acting governor of New Jersey, declared a state of emergency.

 
The storm was blamed for several fatalities, including one person in a tornado in South Carolina, two people in storm-related traffic accidents in New  York and Connecticut,  two people in West Virginia, three people in New Jersey, and prior to its arrival in the East, five deaths in Kansas and Texas. In Quebec, an accident between a van and a tractor trailer killed five occupants of the van in a highway north of Montreal. Numerous other accidents were reported by OPP and the Sûreté du Québec during the storm.

The Boston Marathon  took place in what many considered to be the worst weather in its 110-year history. Race officials held serious talks about whether or not to cancel the race. The men's race had the slowest winning time in thirty years (1977). In the women's race, "[t]he rainy and windy conditions led to the slowest winning time since 1985".

High winds during the storm prevented emergency medical services from using helicopters for evacuation of the injured at the Virginia Tech massacre.

The Internal Revenue Service delayed by two days the deadline for tax filing for victims of the nor'easter.

While filing for federal disaster relief, acting governor Codey of New Jersey indicated that the storm caused $180 million in property damage in New Jersey, making it the second-worst rain storm in its history, after Hurricane Floyd.

Confirmed tornadoes

April 13 event

April 14 event

April 15 event

See also

 Global storm activity of 2007
 Tornadoes of 2007

Notes

References

External links

 Albany, NY National Weather Service Station Storm Summary
 Upton, NY National Weather Service Storm Summary
 Binghamton, NY National Weather Service Storm Summary 
 Duxbury, Massachusetts storm photos 
 Tuckahoe Train Station; The Flood of April 16, 2007

Natural disasters in South Carolina
Natural disasters in Pennsylvania
Natural disasters in New Jersey
Natural disasters in New York (state)
Natural disasters in Connecticut
Natural disasters in Ontario
Natural disasters in Quebec
2007 meteorology
Natural disasters in Virginia
Nor'easters
2007 natural disasters in the United States
2007 in Quebec
December 2007 events in North America
2007 disasters in Canada